Joti or JOTI may refer to:

Jamboree on the Internet, an international Scouting activity
Jyoti swarupini, a rāgam in Carnatic music